The 1989 All-Ireland Senior Camogie Championship was won by Killkenny who defeated Cork by an eight-point margin in the final. The match drew an attendance of 3,024 and marked Angela Downey’s ninth All Ireland medal.

Semi-finals
A great display from Betty Joyce and second half goals from Geraldine McCarthy, Betty Joyce and Cathy Landers helped Cork defeat Wexford in the semi-final. Angela Downey scored 2–3 and Ann Downey 1–4 in Kilkenny’s comprehensive 27-point victory over Dublin also at the semi-final stage.

Final
Cork tried a tactical innovation, a sweeper, in the All-Ireland final at Croke Park on September 24th. Kilkenny played with the wind but their half time lead was down to an Angela Downey goal which was secured with a poor shot for which Marina McCarthy was unsighted. Within 15 second so the restart Linda Mellerick reduced Kilkenny’s lead to one point. Angela Downey kicked a second goal and Ann Downey drove a fifteen-metre free into a crowded goalmouth. The shot was parried but Ann followed up to drive the ball home. Pat Roche wrote in the Irish Times: “the final score tends to flatter Cork who trailed 3–10 to 1–5 in the closing minutes.”

Kilkenny’s second goal
Kilkenny’s second goal was one of the most famous in camogie history for the wrong reasons. A shot from Angela Downey took a deflection to place it out of the reach of Cork goalie, Marion McCarthy, Angela raced in to rob Marion McCarthy of possession, Liz O’Neill’s desperation tackle only succeeded in removing Downey’s skirt. “Marion got the hurl, Liz got the skirt and I still scored,” she said afterwards, as unperturbed, she went on to race past two defenders to kick the ball into the Cork and celebrated the goal, skirtless. “luckily I had the regulation black knickers or I would have been suspended,” she joked afterwards.

The skirt
The footage and photographs of Angela Downey losing her skirt as she scored the final goal were the subject of comment and some controversy pertaining to the coverage of women’s sports. Speaking of the incident twenty years later Angela Downey said “the only time I ever made the front page of the Irish Times it was because I had lost my skirt.“ She was referring to a photograph of the event by Peter Thursfield which was to become one of the most famous in the history of the game.

Final stages

References

1989 in camogie
1989